Citylink or City Link may refer to:

In transport:
 CityLink, a system of tollways, tunnels and bridges in Melbourne, Australia
 Maryland Transit Administration, a system of high-frequency bus routes serving Baltimore, Maryland U.S.
 City Link (company), previously Initial City Link, a former courier company in the United Kingdom
 Central Citylink, a defunct train service brand used by Central Trains in England
 Greater Peoria Mass Transit District also goes by CityLink
Stadler Citylink, a series of tram-trains
 Bus & coach services:
 Scottish Citylink, intercity coach operator in Scotland
 Irish Citylink, intercity coach operator in the Republic of Ireland
 Citylink Edmond, a bus system in Edmond, Oklahoma
 Citylink (Idaho), a bus system in Coeur d'Alene, Idaho
 Greater Peoria Mass Transit District, an Illinois bus system that uses the name CityLink
 CityLink, a bus route operated by Bluestar (bus company) in southern England
 Citylink Coach Services, a bus company in the Philippines
 Airlines:
 CTK – CiTylinK, an airline in Ghana
 Alberta Citylink, an airline in Alberta, Canada
 Citilink Airlines, an airline in Indonesia

In telecommunications:
 Citylink, a consortium to finance the Connect Project radio system on the London Underground
 CityLink Limited, a broadband company in New Zealand

In buildings:
 CityLink Mall, a shopping mall in Singapore
 Citylink Plaza, an office building in Hong Kong
 Citylink (Taiwanese shopping malls), several shopping malls in Taiwan